Toribio Ortega Ramírez (16 April 1870–1914) was a leading general in the Mexican Revolution.  He was born on 16 April 1870, in Coyame, Iturbide district, in the State of Chihuahua.

Family

On November 14, 2011, New Mexico Governor Susana Martinez visited Cuchillo Parado, Mexico, for a celebration in honor of Ortega, her great-grandfather.

Mexican Revolution
Ortega held the rank of general in the Mexican Revolution. Ortega was one of the first to revolt against Porfirio Díaz on November 14, 1910.

Notes

Bibliography 
 

People of the Mexican Revolution
1861 births
1914 deaths